Max Vernon (born May 24, 1988) is an American performer, composer/lyricist, and playwright from Los Angeles, California, currently living and performing in New York City, where they attended New York University. Best known for their work in musical theatre; their musicals include The View UpStairs and KPOP.

Theatre
Max Vernon's original musicals include WIRED (music, lyrics, book; Ars Nova), The View UpStairs (music, lyrics, book; Lynn Redgrave Theatre, Culture Project) - inspired by the UpStairs Lounge arson attack, 30 Million (music, lyrics; book by Jason Kim; Keen Company), and KPOP (music, lyrics; book by Jason Kim; Ars Nova).

The View UpStairs has received numerous regional productions since its original Off-Broadway run, including London (Soho Theatre), Richmond, Chicago, Sydney (Hayes Theatre), Los Angeles (Celebration Theatre), San Francisco (New Conservatory Theatre Center), Boston, Atlanta, Dallas, and Columbus, among others. The piece is published by Samuel French, and the original cast album was released on Broadway Records.

Personal life
Max Vernon identifies as non-binary.

Award and nominations

References

1988 births
Living people
American LGBT dramatists and playwrights
American musical theatre composers
Non-binary dramatists and playwrights
American non-binary writers